Richard A. Caulfield is the former Chancellor of the University of Alaska Southeast.

He graduated from the University of California, Berkeley with BA and BS degrees in Political Science and Natural Resources, from the University of Alaska Fairbanks with a master's degree in education, and from the University of East Anglia with a PhD in Development Studies in 1993. He was previously Provost of the University of Alaska Southeast.

References

Year of birth missing (living people)
Living people
UC Berkeley College of Letters and Science alumni
University of Alaska Fairbanks alumni
Alumni of the University of East Anglia
University of Alaska Southeast faculty
UC Berkeley College of Natural Resources alumni